Ian Iqbal Rashid (born in Dar es Salaam, Tanzania) is a poet, screenwriter and filmmaker known in particular for his volumes of poetry, for the TV series Sort Of and This Life and the feature films Touch of Pink and How She Move.

Life 
Of Indian ancestry and raised in the Ismaili Muslim faith, Rashid's family lived in colonial East Africa for generations. Different years of birth are given for Rashid in different sources, but academic work gives the year as 1968. In the early 1970s, his family was forced to leave Tanzania. After failing to secure asylum in the UK and US, they settled in Toronto.

Rashid began his career as an arts journalist, critic, curator, and events programmer, particularly focussed on South Asian diasporic, Muslim and LGBTQ cultural work.

In the early 1990s, Rashid returned to London, Britain, where he met his partner, the writer, curator, and academic Peter Ride. He then won a bursary to attend a prestigious BBC writing internship programme Black Screen and soon after started working in film and television as a screenwriter, director and producer. He currently divides his time between Canada and the UK.

Works

Television and radio 
Rashid is best known for the iconic BBC show, This Life for which he won a Writer's Guild of Great Britain award, and the current critical hit and Peabody Awards winning series Sort Of, which appeared on many best of end-of-year lists after it dropped on CBC and HBO Max in late 2021. For Sort Of, he has been nominated for best comedy series writer at the 10th Canadian Screen Awards and the 2022 Writers Guild of Canada award for the episode "Sort Of Mary Poppins".

Rashid began working as a writer in UK television in the late 1990s, trained on the BBC's Black Screen internship. His early credits include Dilly Downtown, and the soap London Bridge (Carlton Television for ITV) along with the BAFTA and Royal Television Society award winner, This Life.

For BBC's Woman's Hour Programme, Rashid wrote and directed Leaving Normal, a comedy serial about same-sex adoption starring Imelda Staunton and Meera Syal.

Rashid has created and is currently writing a family dramedy for Amazon Prime Video as well as a young adult fantasy series for the CBC. He is currently co-executive producer and writer on the second season of Sort Of, for the Canadian Broadcasting Corporation and HBO Max.

In 2022, Ian was awarded a fellowship on the CBC-BIPOC TV & Film Showrunner Catalyst in partnership with the Canadian Film Centre as an emerging television/streaming showrunner.

Film 
Self-taught as a film-maker, in 1991, Rashid made the short film Bolo Bolo! with Kaspar Saxena. The film, part of an HIV/AIDS cable access series called Toronto Living With AIDS, resulted in the series being pulled from Rogers Television after complaints about sexually suggestive content, though it had a long and healthy life at film festivals.

Rashid went on to write two award-winning short films, Surviving Sabu (1999, Arts Council of England) and Stag (2001, BBC Films).

Touch of Pink, Rashid's first feature film, spent 12 years in development. In 2003, he finally had the chance to direct the project as a Canada-UK co-production. It premiered at the 2004 Sundance Film Festival to great acclaim, a bidding war, and eventually, a sale to Sony Picture Classics. The film has attracted extensive scholarly commentary.

How She Move received a similarly positive reception at the Sundance Film Festival. Directed by Rashid in 2007, the film is set in the world of step dancing. It was nominated for a Sundance World Cinema Grand Jury Prize and purchased by Paramount Vantage. The film opened to positive reviews and strong box office.

Poetry and short stories 
Rashid published his first poetry collection, Black Markets, White Boyfriends and Other Acts of Elision, in 1991. Two more followed: the chapbook Song of Sabu in 1993 and The Heat Yesterday in 1995. Rashid has recently started publishing poetry again, and a fourth collection is rumoured.

His poems have appeared in journals and been anthologized widely including the poems "Another Country", "Could Have Danced All Night", "Hot Property" and "Early Dinner, Weekend Away"  in John Barton and Billeh Nickerson's 2007 anthology Seminal: The Anthology of Canada's Gay Male Poets,. More early work is included in the 2009 anthology Forbidden Sex, Forbidden Texts: New India's Gay Poets.

He is referenced in the Oxford Companion to Canadian Literature and Making a Difference:Canadian Multicultural Literature.

He wrote and read his short story "Muscular Bridges" for BBC Radio 4's 50th HMT Windrush Anniversary, which later evolved into the feature film Touch of Pink

Rashid has also written song lyrics, most notably for his film Touch of Pink.

Journalism 
In the late 1980s, Rashid was a regular contributor to the Canadian LGBT magazine Rites, and the cultural journals Fuse and TSAR Publications. In 1995, he was the Guest Editor for Rungh magazine's Queer Special Issue. His curatorial catalogue essay for "Beyond Destinations", a show he curated for Ikon Gallery in 1993, was reprinted in Rungh in December 2019. He was also assistant editor of Bazaar Magazine, a quarterly journal covering South Asian arts in the UK in the early 1990s. Ian's personal essays have also been published in Wasafiri, Third Text and The Globe and Mail.

Curating and festivals 
Rashid has also curated film programmes and exhibitions for venues such as the National Film Theatre, the Institute of Contemporary Arts and Experimenta. He was the founder and first director of Desh Pardesh, Canada's first arts festival focusing on diasporic South Asian arts and culture.

Awards 
Amongst many awards and festival prizes, Rashid has received the Writer's Guild of Great Britain Award for Television Series Writing and the Aga Khan Award for Excellence in the Arts. He was selected as one of 2010's Breakthrough Brits on the prestigious UK Film Council (BFI) programme alongside Riz Ahmed, Yann Demange, Daniel Kaluuya and others. His film and TV career began when he won a place on the prestigious BBC internship scheme Black Screen, alongside writers such as playwright Tanika Gupta.

In 2022, Ian was awarded a fellowship on the CBC-BIPOC TV & Film Showrunner Catalyst in partnership with the Canadian Film Centre as an emerging television/streaming Show Runner.

His poetry has been nominated for the Gerald Lampert Memorial Award.

References

External links
 Ian Iqbal Rashid on IMDb

1971 births
20th-century Canadian male writers
20th-century Canadian poets
21st-century Canadian screenwriters
British film directors
British male screenwriters
British male television writers
British male writers
British poets
British television writers
Canadian male poets
Canadian male screenwriters
Canadian writers of Asian descent
Canadian gay writers
LGBT film directors
Canadian LGBT poets
Tanzanian LGBT writers
British LGBT writers
Living people
People from Dar es Salaam
Film directors from Toronto
Tanzanian emigrants to Canada
Canadian emigrants to the United Kingdom
Tanzanian people of Indian descent
Tanzanian Ismailis
British people of Indian descent
British writers of Indian descent
British people of Gujarati descent
British Ismailis
Canadian people of Indian descent
Canadian Ismailis
Indian Ismailis
Khoja Ismailism
Gay poets
Gay screenwriters
21st-century Canadian LGBT people
20th-century Canadian LGBT people